Alfredo Antonio Mejía Escobar (born 3 April 1990) is a Honduran professional footballer who plays as a midfielder for Greek Super League club Levadiakos, whom he captains, and the Honduras national team.

Club career

Mejía had a spell at the reserves of Italian side Udinese before spending two years at Real C.D. España.  He joined F.C. Motagua for the 2012 Clausura championship.

He had a spell at French side Monaco in 2009 and was rumored to join the Seattle Sounders FC after the Sounders sent scouts over to Honduras.

On 29 January 2016, Xanthi officially announced the signing of Honduran defensive midfielder, who was recently released from Marathón.

International career
Mejía played at the 2007 FIFA U-17 World Cup, 2009 FIFA U-20 World Cup and the 2012 Summer Olympics.

Mejía made his senior debut for Honduras in a January 2011 UNCAF Nations Cup match against Costa Rica and has, as of January 2013, earned a total of 15 caps, scoring 1 goal. He has represented his country at the 2011 UNCAF Nations Cup as well as at the 2011 CONCACAF Gold Cup.

International goals

|}

Honours
Levadiakos
Super League 2: 2021–22

References

External links

1990 births
Living people
People from Yoro Department
Association football midfielders
Honduran footballers
Honduras international footballers
2011 Copa Centroamericana players
2011 CONCACAF Gold Cup players
2015 CONCACAF Gold Cup players
2017 Copa Centroamericana players
2017 CONCACAF Gold Cup players
Olympic footballers of Honduras
Footballers at the 2012 Summer Olympics
C.D. Olimpia players
Real C.D. España players
F.C. Motagua players
C.D. Marathón players
Panthrakikos F.C. players
Xanthi F.C. players
Pontevedra CF footballers
Levadiakos F.C. players
Liga Nacional de Fútbol Profesional de Honduras players
Super League Greece players
Segunda División B players
Super League Greece 2 players
Copa Centroamericana-winning players
2009 CONCACAF U-20 Championship players
Honduran expatriate footballers
Expatriate footballers in Greece
Expatriate footballers in Spain
Honduran expatriate sportspeople in Greece
Honduran expatriate sportspeople in Spain